Tarzan and the Trappers is a 1958 action adventure film featuring Edgar Rice Burroughs' famous jungle hero Tarzan and starring Gordon Scott, Eve Brent, Rickie Sorensen and Lesley Bradley. It was filmed as three pilot episodes for a television series which were edited into a feature film when the project was abandoned, and so was released in black and white rather than color, like other contemporary Tarzan films. The film did finally appear on television, but only in 1966. It was shot in Chatsworth, California.

Plot
The idyllic jungle life of Tarzan (Gordon Scott), Jane (Eve Brent) and Tartu (Rickie Sorensen) is interrupted by a drum message telling them of predatory hunters loose in the jungle. Tarzan disrupts the animal-collecting expedition of the hunters, Schroeder (Lesley Bradley) and Rene (Maurice Marsac); he frees a baby elephant whose mother they have killed and then leads the elephant herd against them when they make hostages of Tartu and Cheeta the chimp.

Afterwards he warns off two other hunters, Sikes (Saul Gorse) and Lapin (William Keene), seeking to plunder the lost city of Zarbo. He is attacked by their men, but escapes and shadows their party. Aware of Tarzan's continued presence, the hunters capture his native friend Tyana (Sherman Crothers), and trap the ape man when he tries to free him. Tyana's tribe rescues the two. Finally, the hunters reach Zarbo, but find it empty of both people and treasure. In a final conflict, Tarzan overcomes the villains, who are then turned over to the authorities by the natives.

Cast
 Gordon Scott as Tarzan  
 Eve Brent as Jane
 Rickie Sorensen as Tartu
 Lesley Bradley as Schroeder
 Maurice Marsac as Rene
 Bruce Lester as Commissioner Brandini 
 Naaman Brown as Tribesman 
 Paul Thompson as Tribesman 
 Carl Christian as Tribesman 
 Sol Gorss as Sikes (as Saul Gorse)
 William Keene as Lapin
 Sherman Crothers as Tyana (as Sherman Crothers)
 Madame Sul-Te-Wan as Witch Woman
 Paul Stader as Sikes' Henchman 
 Don Blackman as Tribesman

External links
 
 
Tarzan and the Trappers entry on "Down Memory Lane with Tarzan (Gordon Scott)"
Tarzan and the Trappers entry on At-A-Glance Film Reviews
 ERBzine Silver Screen: Tarzan and the Trappers

1958 films
1950s action adventure films
1950s fantasy adventure films
American action adventure films
American fantasy adventure films
American sequel films
Films directed by H. Bruce Humberstone
Films shot in California
Tarzan films
Television films as pilots
Television pilots not picked up as a series
Films produced by Sol Lesser
1950s English-language films
1950s American films